Reaction.life is a British news website that features reporting and analysis on politics, economics, culture and ideas.

Reaction is based in London and edited by former Scotsman, Telegraph and Wall Street Journal executive Iain Martin, who is also a columnist for The Times. In July 2016 Robert Gascoyne-Cecil, 7th Marquess of Salisbury joined the board as Chairman. Mark Fox is Deputy Chairman.

Notable stories 

On 30 June 2016, Boris Johnson withdrew from the Conservative Party leadership election, Iain Martin published an account of the run up to the unexpected announcement that day describing it as a "cuckoo in the nest" plot by Michael Gove.

During the leadership election,  Reaction published an article by a former colleague of Andrea Leadsom, Robert Stephens, alleging that she had misstated the extent of her roles in the financial sector. This was the first of a series of revelations that lead to Leadsom withdrawing from the contest to become leader of the Conservative Party and UK Prime Minister.

Columnists 

Regular writers and columnists for Reaction.life include:

 Adam Boulton, Editor-at-large of Sky News
 Alastair Benn, Deputy Editor of Reaction.life
 Alice Crossley, Features Editor of Reaction.life
 Andrew Lilico, The Telegraph columnist
 Anthony Peters, strategy consultant and financial writer
 Caitlin Allen, journalist
 Chris Blackhurst, former Editor of The Independent
 Dominic Frisby, comedian, financial writer and voice actor
 Gabriel Gavin, journalist and writer
 Iain Dale, broadcaster and commentator
 Maggie Pagano, Executive Editor of Reaction.life
 Mattie Brignall, News Editor of Reaction.life
 Mutaz Ahmed, Telegraph reporter
 Oliver Rhodes, Online Editor of Reaction.life
 Olivia Utley, Telegraph Assistant Comment Editor
 Rachel Cunliffe, New Statesman Deputy Online Editor
 Robert Fox, Defence journalist

References

British news websites